St Faith under St Paul's in Castle Baynard Ward was an unusual parish within the City of London. It originally  had its  own building to the east of St Paul's  Cathedral, serving as a parish church  for the residents of St Paul's  Churchyard  and Paternoster Row, but this was removed in 1256 to allow for the eastern expansion of the Cathedral. The parishioners were instead given a space to worship within the cathedral crypt.

The parish appears as "St Faith within the monastery of St Paul's, London" in 1381, with mention of John Phelip, as a former parson.

Until the reign of Edward VI the parishioners worshipped at the end of the west crypt under St Paul’s Quire. Sir Simonds D'Ewes, the diarist, attended the wedding of his father Paul and his stepmother, Lady Elizabeth Denton, in "St. Faith's under St. Paul's" on 5 March 1623, and Sir Simonds's younger sister Mary also married there on 4 December 1626 From the reign of Edward VI until the Great Fire the parishioners, mostly booksellers in Paternoster Row, transferred to the Jesus Chapel, their separateness emphasised by a screen.

After the destruction of the cathedral by the Great Fire in 1666, the parish was united with that of St Augustine Watling Street.

Burials
Christopher Barker (officer of arms)
Margaret Talbot, Countess of Shrewsbury

References

External links

1666 disestablishments in England
Churches in the City of London
Churches destroyed in the Great Fire of London and not rebuilt
Former buildings and structures in the City of London